Twose is a surname. Notable people with the surname include:

 Luis Antonio Twose (born 1950), Spanish field hockey player
 Richard Twose (born 1963), English cricketer
 Roger Twose (born 1968), New Zealand cricketer